FV Northern Belle was a fishing vessel that sank in the Gulf of Alaska on April 20, 2010. Three of her four crew were rescued alive; her captain, Robert Royer, died before rescue teams arrived.

Upon discovery that the EPIRB (Emergency position-indicating radiobeacon) was not operational, Captain Robert Royer returned to the bridge to send a distress call, believed to have saved the other crew members. Royer suffered a major head injury trying to jump overboard, and was found with no vital signs when the US Coastguard arrived.

References

1979 ships
2010 in Alaska
Fishing ships of the United States
Maritime incidents in 2010
Shipwrecks of the Alaska coast